The 1899 Buffalo football team represented the University of Buffalo as an independent during the 1899 college football season. Under head coach Bemus Pierce, the team finished the season 7–1 overall. No collegiate team was able to score on them the entire year. The Buffalo offense scored 177 points while the defense allowed 52 points.

Schedule

References

Buffalo
Buffalo Bulls football seasons
Buffalo football